The 1994 Topper South American Open was an Association of Tennis Professionals men's tennis tournament held in Buenos Aires, Argentina and played on outdoor clay courts. It was the 23rd edition of the tournament and was held from 7 November through 14 November 1994. Third-seeded Àlex Corretja won the singles title.

Finals

Singles

 Àlex Corretja defeated  Javier Frana 6–3, 5–7, 7–6(7–5)
 It was Corretja's only title of the year and the 1st of his career.

Doubles

 Sergio Casal /  Emilio Sánchez defeated  Tomás Carbonell /  Francisco Roig 6–3, 6–2 
 It was Casal's 2nd title of the year and the 46th of his career. It was Sánchez's 2nd title of the year and the 63rd of his career.

References

External links 
 Association of Tennis Professionals (ATP) tournament profile

 
Topper South American Open Tennis Championships
ATP Buenos Aires
November 1994 sports events in South America
ATP Buenos Aires